Pathivratha is a 1965 Indian Kannada-language film, directed by P. S. Murthy and produced by M. N. Srinivas. The film stars Rajkumar, Udaykumar and Harini. The film has musical score by T. A. Moti. The movie took six years (from 1959 to 1965) to complete which is the longest time period a movie starring Rajkumar was in production.

Cast
Rajkumar
Udaykumar
Harini

Soundtrack

References

External links
 

1960s Kannada-language films